Saint-Aubin-Routot is a commune in the Seine-Maritime department in the Normandy region in northern France.

Geography

Heraldry

Population

Places of interest
 The church of St. Aubin, dating from the nineteenth century.
 The 700-year-old yewtree by the church.

See also
Communes of the Seine-Maritime department

References

Communes of Seine-Maritime